Boris Kotoff (born c. 1928) is a former Canadian football player who played for the Ottawa Rough Riders. He previously played football in Hamilton, Ontario.

Kotoff was a fullback who played three years for Ottawa from 1954 to 1957. Kotoff was probably at training camp with Ottawa in 1957, but did not play in any regular season games. In 1958, Kotoff was in the Montreal training camp, but again did not play any regular season games. He ran for 132 yards in his career on 31 attempts, scoring 1 rushing touchdown. He also caught 7 passes for 106 yards.

References

Possibly living people
1920s births
Players of Canadian football from Ontario
Canadian football running backs
Ottawa Rough Riders players
Sportspeople from Hamilton, Ontario